The realme C3 and realme C3i are slate-format Android smartphones developed by Realme and released in February 2020 in India and March 2020 in the Philippines. Priced just under $120 and running Android 11, Realme positions it as a budget gaming handset capable of playing PlayerUnknown's Battlegrounds and Mobile Legends: Bang Bang, and is the first device to ship with the MediaTek Helio G70 system-on-chip.

Features

Hardware
Several variants of the phone were released, with different internal storage capacity, RAM, cameras and NFC support depending on the country. The Indian-market variant only comes with two rear cameras and omits the fingerprint sensor, while the international version is equipped with three rear cameras and a fingerprint sensor. Realme later went on to release the Narzo 10A in India, which is essentially the same device as the international C3 variant apart from a redesigned back cover. The Australian-market release is almost identical to the international variants with the addition of an NFC sensor for wireless payments.

The C3 also comes with a 3.5mm headset jack, a Micro-USB charging port, a 5000mAh lithium-ion battery with reverse-charging support, allowing the phone to double as a power bank, as well as a dual Nano-SIM and MicroSD card tray.

The C3 was initially sold in two colour variants: Frozen Blue and Blazing red; a third colour option named Volcano Grey was later released. The Indian-market Narzo 10A also came in two variants, namely So White and So Blue. Both omit the sunburst design in favour of a glossy back cover with the Realme logo prominently displayed in large type.

Software
The phone runs on the Android 10 operating system overlaid with Realme's proprietary Realme UI 1.0 interface. An update to Android 11 was announced to be released in March 2021; unofficially, the C3 received ports of LineageOS 18.1 along with a few other custom ROMs.

Reception
The C3 was released to mostly positive reception, with reviewers praising the phone's value proposition and specifications.

While John Nieves of Unbox.ph did criticise the phone's lack of a USB-C port, slow charge times and camera quality, he otherwise remarked the phone's design and performance for its price point, with system-intensive games such as Call of Duty: Mobile and Asphalt 8: Airborne running at decent frame rates. Fergus Halliday of PC World Australia was less than enthusiastic however, expressing criticism towards the C3's camera, onboard storage and overall performance.

References

External links
 Official website (India)
Official website (Philippines)
Official website (Europe)

Realme mobile phones
Android (operating system) devices
Phablets
Mobile phones introduced in 2020
Mobile phones with multiple rear cameras